Pieces of Light is an album by multi-instrumentalist and composer Joe McPhee with John Snyder on synthesizer recorded in 1972 and originally released on the CjR label, then reissued by Atavistic in 2005.

Reception

The Allmusic review by Thom Jurek stated "The result is a meandering six-part meditation on how best to combine acoustically and electrically driven sounds... most of Pieces of Light is merely a curiosity". On All About Jazz writer Kurt Gottschalk noted "McPhee at times plays marvelously jazzy in alien vistas and if Snyder's synthesizer sounds a bit dated at times it never comes off as quaint".

Track listing 
All compositions by Joe McPhee and John Snyder
 "Prologue/Twelve" - 9:13
 "Shadow Sculptures" - 3:38
 "Heros Sont Fatigues" - 7:41
 "Red Giant" - 3:08
 "Windows in Dreams/Colors in Crystal" - 23:07

Personnel 
Joe McPhee - tenor saxophone, trumpet, pocket trumpet, flugelhorn, E-Flat alto, modified nagoya harp, chimes, voice
John Snyder - synthesizers

References 

Joe McPhee albums
1974 albums
Atavistic Records albums